Bacillus clarkii is a facultative anaerobe bacterium. It is a gram positive,  alkaliphilic and alkalitolerant, aerobic endospore-forming bacteria.

This species has been recently transferred into the genus Evansella. The correct nomenclature is Evansella clarkii.

References

Further reading

External links
UniProt entry
Type strain of Bacillus clarkii at BacDive -  the Bacterial Diversity Metadatabase

clarkii
Bacteria described in 1995